The Multifunctional Complex Gulliver is a 35-story mixed-use building in Kyiv, the capital of Ukraine.

It is located at the very center of the city near Palats Sportu metro station (municipal address: 1, Sportyvna Sq). It is the second highest building and the highest office building in the country.

The complex consists of a 35-story office building and an adjoining 10- to 16-story shopping mall with movie theaters, restaurants and other business and entertainment spots.

Originally the building was to be called "Continental", but in 2011 it was named "Gulliver" after the eponymous hero of Jonathan Swift's novel Gulliver's Travels.

See also
 List of tallest buildings in Europe

References

External links
 Official website

Buildings and structures in Kyiv
Skyscrapers in Ukraine
Office buildings in Kyiv
Pecherskyi District
Shopping malls in Kyiv
Tourist attractions in Kyiv
Shopping malls established in 2013
Skyscraper office buildings